Andreas "Andy" Ram (born April 10, 1980) is a retired Israeli professional tennis player.  He was primarily a doubles player, and competed in three Olympics.

He is the first Israeli tennis player to win a senior Grand Slam event.  Ram first won the mixed doubles title at the 2006 Wimbledon Championships, together with Vera Zvonareva.  He then won the mixed doubles title at the 2007 French Open with Nathalie Dechy, and the men's doubles title at the 2008 Australian Open with Jonathan Erlich.

Ram attained his highest doubles ranking of World No. 5 in July 2008. He reached 36 doubles finals and won 20 of them through 2013, mostly with partner Jonathan Erlich; together, they are known in Israel as "AndiYoni".  His Davis Cup doubles record, as of 2018, was 20–7.

In May 2014 he announced his retirement, to take effect after Israel's Davis Cup tie in September. In April 2015, Ram, CEO of Pulse Play, announced his new startup – wearable technology and an app for amateur tennis players around the world.

Early and personal life
Ram was born Andreas Ram in Montevideo, Uruguay, and is Jewish.  His father Amiram, a former professional football player for Beitar Jerusalem in the 1950s, was Israeli.  After his father was injured he was sent to Uruguay on "shlihut" ("outreach"), and it was there that he met Ram's mother, who is Uruguayan. She is a dental specialist for children.  He has an older brother and a younger sister. They moved to Jerusalem when he was five, which is when he began playing tennis.  "It was tough at the beginning because I couldn't speak the language, and was fighting with people in the kindergarten who didn't understand me", said Ram.  "My parents decided to send me to the tennis center not long after we arrived."

He married his wife Shiri in September 2006, and they have 3 children. The family lives in Tel Aviv.
 Ram is a fan of the football team Beitar Jerusalem.

Tennis career

Early years of tennis
"I really enjoyed playing tennis, because when I was six or seven years old and winning tournaments it felt good", said Ram.  "From when I was 8 or 10 I knew it was going to be a career for me.  It's a tennis life so it wasn't so easy.  You have to give up many things. When all my friends were playing outside I had to practice. I didn't go to all the school trips. But I was focused from a very young age. I grew up practicing at the Jerusalem tennis center. I spent most of my childhood there, practicing five days a week. I never regretted it and I enjoyed every moment. Now I am reaping the rewards."

Ram was trained by Ronen Moralli at the Israel Tennis Centers in Jerusalem. When he was 15 he was sent to the Wingate Institute, where young Israeli athletes are groomed to become professionals.  "It wasn't easy being far away from your family", Ram remembers, "but you know it is going to be your profession and that's what you are going to try to do for life. You practice twice a day and fit in school in between."  He became a professional tennis player in 1996, at the age of 16, but did not compete in a Grand Slam tournament until 2001 when he appeared in the Wimbledon doubles with Erlich. It was at Wingate that he first met Jonathan Erlich, his future doubles partner who was also born in South America.

2002
In 2002 Ram was injured, and did not play because he had knee surgery and back surgery.  He was on crutches for two months, could not walk, and considered giving up tennis.

2003
In 2003 Ram won the doubles title at the RCA Championship with Croatian Mario Ančić.

With partner Jonathan Erlich, his groundbreaking achievement was their reaching the semifinals of the Wimbledon Championships in 2003 as unknown qualifiers.  They defeated three seeded opponents en route to the semifinals.  In the quarterfinals, in a match in which neither side broke service, Ram and Erlich defeated No. 2 seeded Mark Knowles and Daniel Nestor in straight sets:  7–6, 7–6, 7–6.  In the semis, Ram and Erlich – the first Israelis to ever advance to the semifinals in any Grand Slam event – lost to the defending Wimbledon champions, Jonas Björkman and Todd Woodbridge.

Ram reached the 2003 Wimbledon mixed doubles final with Anastassia Rodionova of Russia.  The couple lost to tennis legend Martina Navratilova and Leander Paes.

Ram felt at that point that he had to choose whether to focus on doubles or singles, as he felt it would be tough to combine the two.  He chose to concentrate on doubles.

Ram and Erlich then won the Thailand Open in September and the Lyon tournament in October 2003.  They also won first place in Indianapolis, Istanbul, India, Rotterdam, and Milan.

2004
Ram competed in the mixed doubles event at the 2004 French Open with partner Petra Mandula of Hungary, and made it as far as the quarterfinals where they lost to Daniela Hantuchová and doubles ace Todd Woodbridge.  Ram and Erlich were triumphant yet again in the Lyon International Series tournament in October 2004.  They defeated Jonas Björkman and Radek Štěpánek in the final with a 7–6, 6–2 victory.

2005
In the 2005 Australian Open Ram paired up with Conchita Martínez of Spain in the mixed doubles event.  Martinez and Ram pulled off an impressive coup in the quarterfinals, beating top seeds Daniel Nestor and Rennae Stubbs 7–5, 6–7, 7–6.  They fell in the semifinals to Aussie pair Scott Draper and Samantha Stosur 7–5, 6–3.

Ram and Erlich won their fourth major tournament in Rotterdam in February 2005, beating Czechs Cyril Suk and Pavel Vízner for the honors.  They missed the 2005 French Open grand slam tournament, as Ram's father had died as he was preparing to fly to France.

In August 2005, playing singles he defeated world # 56 Ricardo Mello of Brazil 6–1, 6–4, at the New Haven International.

Ram and Erlich played in the mixed doubles competition in Wimbledon 2005.  They faced Kevin Ullyett and Liezel Huber in the quarterfinals, and were eliminated 6–4, 3–6, 8–6.  They reached 8th place in the doubles race ranking at the end of 2005, and served as alternates at the Masters Cup in Shanghai.

2007

At the 2007 French Open, Ram, along with his partner, Nathalie Dechy, won the Mixed doubles competition.  Ram and Dechy teamed up together again to compete in the 2007 Wimbledon Championships, losing in the third round to 9th-ranked Marcin Matkowski and Cara Black 6–3, 6–4.

At Cincinnati, at the ATP World Tour Masters 1000, in August he and Erlich won, upsetting the world # 1 Bryan brothers in the final 4–6, 6–3, 13–11.  At the US Open, he played doubles with Erlich, losing in the round of 16 to the eventual winners Simon Aspelin and Julian Simon 5–7, 6–7.  In mixed doubles with Nathalie Dechy he made it to the quarter finals.

2008
At the 2008 Australian Open Ram and Erlich won the Men's Doubles Championship in straight sets over Arnaud Clément and Michaël Llodra 7–5, 7–6. This was the duo's first Grand Slam win after numerous ATP titles, and was also Israel's first ever Grand Slam trophy in Men's Doubles. The duo also won the Masters Series event at Indian Wells, California by defeating the team of Nestor and Zimonic in the finals. After Erlich's injury, Ram was playing with other partners and won indoor titles in Vienna (with Max Mirnyi) and Lyon (with Llodra).

2009
At the 2009 Australian Open Ram and Nathalie Dechy, unseeded at the start of the tournament, defeated two seeded pairs and reached the finals, where they lost to another unseeded pair, Sania Mirza and Mahesh Bhupathi from India, 3–6, 1–6. Later Ram won the Miami Masters tournament with Mirnyi after reaching finals in the Indian Wells Masters. Ram partnered Erlich once again at Israel Open ATP Challenger tournament in Ramat HaSharon in May, but after losing in the final he announced his decision to keep partnering with Mirnyi until the end of 2009 season (with the exception of a Davis Cup match against Russia, where he would partner with Erlich).

2010–2014 
He partnered with Julian Knowle for the 2010 French Open. They reached the semi-finals, which was the best result for either player at the French Open.

In 2011, Ram and Erlich won both the 2011 Winston-Salem Open and the Eastbourne International tournament.

In May 2012, Ram and Erlich won the Serbia Open in Belgrade.

In May 2014, at age 34, he announced his retirement, to take effect after Israel's Davis Cup tie in September.

Significant finals

Grand Slam finals

Doubles: 1 (1 title)

Mixed doubles: 4 (2 titles, 2 runner-ups)

ATP career finals

Doubles: 37 (19 titles, 18 runner-ups)

ATP Challenger and ITF Futures finals

Singles: 7 (4–3)

Doubles: 33 (23–10)

Junior Grand Slam finals

Doubles: 2 (2 runner-ups)

Performance timelines

Singles

Doubles

Mixed doubles

Davis Cup

Ram played on the Israel Davis Cup team in 2001–09, going 14–8 through July 2009.  In 2007 he won two matches in Israel's 5–0 win over Luxembourg, and he won his doubles matches in Israel's 3–2 wins over Italy and over Chile (in which he and Erlich defeated Olympic gold medal winners González and Massú). In 2008, Ram and Erlich won their doubles match against Simon Aspelin and Robert Lindstedt in Israel's 3–2 loss to Sweden in the World group, and then Ram partnering Harel Levy defeated the Peruvian duo Mauricio Echazu/Matias Silva on the way to Israel's 4–1 victory, granting Israel a place in the World Group for the next season. In March 2009, partnering Amir Hadad, Ram lost in Malmö to the same Swedish pair he defeated a year earlier, but the Israeli team won 3–2 overall and proceeded to the World Group quarterfinal.

Israel (ranked 8th in the Davis Cup standings, with 5,394 points) hosted heavily favored Russia (which won in both 2002 and 2006, and was the top-ranked country in Davis Cup standings, with 27,897 points) in a Davis Cup quarterfinal tie in July 2009, on indoor hard courts at the Nokia Arena in Tel Aviv.  Israel was represented by Ram, Erlich, Dudi Sela, and Harel Levy.  Russia's lineup consisted of Marat Safin (# 24 in the world; former world # 1), Igor Andreev (26), Igor Kunitsyn (35), and Mikhail Youzhny (44; former world # 8).  The stage was set by Safin, who prior to the tie told the press:  "With all due respect, Israel was lucky to get to the quarterfinals."  The Israeli team's response was to beat the Russian team in each of their first three matches, thereby winning the tie.  Levy, world # 210, beat Russia's top player, Andreev, world # 24, 6–4, 6–2, 4–6, 6–2 in the opening match.  Sela (# 33) followed by beating Russian Youzhny 3–6, 6–1, 6–0, 7–5.  Israeli captain Eyal Ran likened his players to two fighter jets on court, saying:  "I felt as if I had two F-16s out there today, they played amazingly well."  The 10,500 spectators were the largest crowd ever for a tennis match in Israel.  The next day Ram and Erlich beat Safin and Kunitsyn 6–3, 6–4, 6–7, 4–6, 6–4 in front of a boisterous crowd of over 10,000.  "I started to cry like a little boy", said Ram.  Even the Saudi Gazette described the doubles match as a "thrilling" win.  Captain Ran was carried shoulder-high around the Tel Aviv stadium, as the 10,000-strong crowd applauded.  With the tie clinched for Israel, the reverse singles rubbers were "dead", and instead of best-of-five matches, best-of-three sets were played, with the outcomes of little to no importance. Israel wrapped up a 4–1 victory over Russia, as Levy defeated Kunitsyn 6–4, 4–6, 7–6, while Sela retired with a wrist injury while down 3–4 in the first set against Andreev. Israel next faced the Spanish Davis Cup team in Marbella, Spain on September 18–20, in Israel's first appearance in the Davis Cup semifinals.
Spain won a 4–1 victory over Israel.

Olympics
Erlich and Ram represented Israel at the 2004 Summer Olympics in Athens, and reached the quarterfinals. Ranked 8th overall, in the 1st round they defeated Thomas Enqvist and Robin Söderling of Sweden 7–5, 6–3, and then beat Russians Igor Andreev and Nikolay Davydenko in the 2nd round 6–4, 6–1.  In the quarterfinals they were defeated by Germans Nicolas Kiefer and Rainer Schüttler in three sets, 6–2, 2–6, 2–6.

They also represented Israel at the 2008 Summer Olympics in Beijing, China, where they lost to the French team of Arnaud Clément and Michaël Llodra in the first round, and at the 2012 Summer Olympics, where they were beaten by the Bryan brothers in the quarter final.

They then represented Israel at the 2012 Summer Olympics in London, England, where they defeated Roger Federer and Stanislas Wawrinka, before losing to the Bryan brothers, who won the gold medal.

Award
Ram was awarded the inaugural Jerusalem Athlete of the Year award in 2006.

Business venture after tennis career

In April 2015, Ram, co-founder and CEO of Pulse Play, announced his new startup – wearable technology and an app for amateur tennis players around the world. It is a smartwatch designed to handle intense and animated tennis, table tennis, badminton, and squash. It operates in real time and connects to the cloud, so users can find nearby opponents, see how they rank against other players worldwide, and track their improvement. Ram raised money initially in crowd-funding on Indiegogo.

See also
List of select Jewish tennis players

References

External links

 
 
 
 
 
 
 Andy Ram at the Jewish Virtual Library
 
 

Israeli male tennis players
Olympic tennis players of Israel
Tennis players at the 2004 Summer Olympics
Tennis players at the 2008 Summer Olympics
Tennis players at the 2012 Summer Olympics
Wimbledon champions
1980 births
Living people
Jewish tennis players
Sportspeople from Montevideo
Uruguayan people of Israeli descent
Uruguayan emigrants to Israel
Uruguayan Jews
Israeli Jews
Israeli people of Uruguayan-Jewish descent
Wingate Institute alumni
Grand Slam (tennis) champions in mixed doubles
Grand Slam (tennis) champions in men's doubles